The Sea is a 1933 Polish short documentary film directed by Wanda Jakubowska. It was nominated for an Academy Award in 1933 for Best Short Subject (Novelty).

Cast
 Gayne Whitman as Narrator (USA version)

References

External links

1933 films
1933 documentary films
1930s short documentary films
1930s Polish-language films
Polish short documentary films
Polish black-and-white films
Films directed by Wanda Jakubowska
Films directed by Jerzy Zarzycki
Black-and-white documentary films